Calcium is a chemical element with symbol Ca and atomic number 20.

Calcium may also refer to:

 Calcium, New York, a census-designated place in Jefferson County, New York
Calcium, Queensland, a locality in the City of Townsville, Australia
 "Calcium", a song on the album Accelerator by The Future Sound of London
 "Calcium", a song on the album DeadBoy by Bones

See also

 Calcium in biology, for the role of calcium in biology and nutrition
 Calcium supplement, for the medical uses of calcium
 Isotopes of calcium
 Ca (disambiguation)